Harbour Villages is an electoral ward of Chichester District, West Sussex, England and returns three members to sit on Chichester District Council.

Following a district boundary review, Harbour Villages was created from the Bosham, Donnington, Fishbourne and Southbourne wards in 2019.

Councillor

Election results

References

External links
 Chichester District Council
 Election Maps

Wards of Chichester District